Veinticinco de Mayo is a department of the province of Río Negro  (Argentina).

References 

Departments of Río Negro  Province